WRU may refer to:

 Welsh Rugby Union, sports association in Wales
 Waikato Rugby Union, sports association in Waikato, New Zealand
 Wesleyan Reform Union, Methodist church group in Britain
 WRU, station code for West Ruislip station, Hillingdon, Greater London, UK
 Western Reserve University, now part of Case Western Reserve University in Cleveland, Ohio